Visselhövede is a town in the district of Rotenburg in Lower Saxony, Germany. Nearby towns include the district capital Rotenburg, Walsrode and Verden. Larger cities within a 100 km radius are Bremen, Hanover and Hamburg.

Visselhövede belonged to the Prince-Bishopric of Verden, established in 1180. In 1648 the Prince-Bishopric was transformed into the Principality of Verden, which was first ruled in personal union by the Swedish Crown - interrupted by a Danish occupation (1712–1715) - and from 1715 on by the Hanoverian Crown. The Kingdom of Hanover incorporated the Principality in a real union and the Princely territory, including Visselhövede, became part of the new Stade Region, established in 1823.

See also
 Visselhövede station

References

Rotenburg (district)